The Jinshuitan Dam is an arch dam on Longquan Creek, a tributary of the Oujiang River in Zhejiang Province, China. The dam and power station were completed in 1988 and serve several purposes to include hydroelectric power generation, water supply, flood control and navigation. It is the first dam of the Oujiang River cascade to be constructed and creates the second largest lake in Zhejiang.

Background
Construction on the dam began in October 1981 and the river was closed the same month in 1983. In 1986, the reservoir began filling and reached conservation storage level. On 7 April 1987, the first generator went online and by 31 December 1988, the other three generators in the power station were commissioned.

Design
The dam has two spillways that lie on either side of the power station. Each spillway has a shallow and an intermediate opening. The shallow openings have a maximum discharge of  while the intermediate can discharge . The power station is located at the base of the dam and contains the six 50 MW Francis turbine-generators which are each supplied with water via a  diameter penstock. Between the power station and the east spillway, there is a boat/raft lift to move small vessels and lumber from the river below into the reservoir.

See also

List of dams and reservoirs in China
List of major power stations in Zhejiang

References

Dams in China
Hydroelectric power stations in Zhejiang
Arch dams
Dams completed in 1968